Nor Cinti is a province in the Bolivian department of Chuquisaca. Its capital is Camargo.

Geography 
Other mountains are listed below:

Subdivision 
The province is divided into four municipalities  which are further subdivided into cantons.

See also 
 Chiñi Mayu
 Inka Wasi River
 Santa Elena River
 T'uruchipa River

References 

Provinces of Chuquisaca Department